Broadwing may refer to:

 broad-winged hawk, a bird of prey.
 Broadwing, a bird of prey with broad wings such as eagles, falcons, buzzards, goshawks or sparrowhawks.